Osvaldo "Cocho" López (born December 3, 1947 in Buenos Aires), is a retired Argentine racing driver. He began his career in 1967 and retired in the early 2000s.

He won the TC2000 championship in 1979 and he was runner-up in the South American Super Touring Car Championship in 1997 and 2000. He won other titles at Club Argentino de Pilotos and Formula 2 Argentina. He was in the 1993 24 Hours of Daytona with Team Argentina, sharing his car with Oscar Aventín, Osvaldo Morresi and Juan Manuel Landa.

His son Juan Manuel López is also a racing driver.

Racing record

Complete European Formula Two Championship results 
(key) (Races in bold indicate pole position; races in italics indicate fastest lap)

References

1947 births
Living people
Argentine racing drivers
Turismo Carretera drivers
TC 2000 Championship drivers